Cyberwarfare is a part of Iran's "soft war" military strategy. Being both a victim and wager of cyberwarfare, Iran is considered an emerging military power in the field.

Since November 2010, an organization called "The Cyber Defense Command" (Gharargah-e Defa-e Saiberi) has been operating in Iran under the supervision of the country's "Passive Civil Defense Organization" (Sazeman-e Padafand-e Gheyr-e Amel) which is itself a subdivision of the Joint Staff of Iranian Armed Forces.

According to a 2014 report by Institute for National Security Studies, Iran is "one of the most active players in the international cyber arena". In 2013, a Revolutionary Guards general stated that Iran has "the 4th biggest cyber power among the world's cyber armies."

According to a 2021 report by a cyber-security company, "Iran is running two surveillance operations in cyber-space, targeting more than 1,000 dissidents".

NIN 
Iranian cyber defense system - digital fortress part of national information network (national internet) - is developed for thwarting and attacks and  engage attackers. In November 2022, Iranian Majlis Islamic Consultative Assembly recommended a Passive Defence Incorporation.

Attacks against Iran 
In June 2010, Iran was the victim of a cyber-attack when its nuclear facility in Natanz was infiltrated by the cyber-worm 'Stuxnet'. Reportedly a combined effort by the United States and Israel, Stuxnet destroyed perhaps over 1,000 nuclear centrifuges and, according to a Business Insider article, "[set] Tehran's atomic programme back by at least two years." The worm spread beyond the plant to allegedly infect over 60,000 computers, but the government of Iran indicates it caused no significant damage. Iran crowdsourced solutions to the worm and is purportedly now better positioned in terms of cyber warfare technology. No government has claimed responsibility for the worm. The cyber-worm was also used against North Korea.

Events 
 In October 2013, media reported Mojtaba Ahmadi, who served as commander of the "Cyber War Headquarters" was found dead wounded by bullets in Karaj.
  November 2018: The Iranian telecommunication minister Mohammad-Javad Azari Jahromi accuses Israel of a failed cyberattack on its telecommunications infrastructure, and vows to respond with legal action.
October 2021: An attack paralyzed gas stations across the country, preventing users from purchasing fuel using state-issued cards and digital billboards displayed antigovernment messages
In September, October and November 2022, Iranian state networks and emails came under attack by Anonymous and other hacking groups acting in solidarity with Iranian protestors.

Attacks by Iran 
The Iranian government has been accused by western analysts of its own cyber-attacks against the United States, Israel and Persian Gulf Arab countries, but denied this, including specific allegations of 2012 involvement in hacking into American banks. The conflict between Iran and the United States has been called "history's first known cyber-war" by Michael Joseph Gross mid-2013.

Events 
  August 2014: An IDF official told press in that Iran has launched numerous significant attacks against Israel's Internet infrastructure.
  31 March 2015: There was a massive power outage for 12 hours in 44 of 81 provinces of Turkey, holding 40 million people. Istanbul and Ankara were among the places suffering blackout. According to Observer.com, Iranian hackers, possibly Iranian Cyber Army, were behind the power outage.
  June 2017: The Daily Telegraph reported that intelligence officials concluded that Iran was responsible for a cyberattack on the British Parliament lasting 12 hours that compromised around 90 email accounts of MPs. The motive for the attack is unknown but experts suggested that the Islamic Revolutionary Guard Corps could be using cyberwarfare to undermine the Iran nuclear deal.
  January 2022: The website of Israel's Jerusalem Post newspaper and the Twitter account of Maariv newspaper are hacked by suspected Iranian hackers. The website's content was replaced with a threat to target the Shimon Peres Negev Nuclear Research Center, and an apparent reference to Qasem Soleimani who was assassinated exactly two years earlier in Baghdad, Iraq.
  March 2022: Large-scale cyberattacks were launched against multiple Israeli government websites, allegedly by Iran as retaliation for failed Mossad operations, though neither the attack attribution nor the purported Mossad operations could be confirmed as of March 2022. The National Cyber Directorate declared a state of emergency as a result of the attacks and unnamed defense sources told media outlets it was possibly the largest-ever cyberattack against Israel.
  November 2022: Iranian hackers attacked Albanian networks.
  November seventeen American networks system were turned into mining crypto because of existing undefended vulnerability.

Suspended Iranian accounts 
On May 5, 2020, Reuters reported, quoting a monthly Facebook report, that Iranian state-run media had targeted hundreds of fake social media accounts to covertly spread pro-Iranian messaging, online since at least 2011, for secretly broadcasting online promotional messages in favor of Iran in order targeting voters in countries including Britain and the United States. Accounts suspended for coordinated inauthentic behavior, which removed eight networks in recent weeks, including one with links to the Islamic Republic of Iran Broadcasting.

See also 
 Ashiyane
 List of cyber warfare forces
 Iranian Cyber Army
 Iran Cyber Police
 Communications in Iran
 Monica Witt
 Hybrid warfare against Iran
 Iran Mission Center
Alleged operations and malware against Iran
 Operation Olympic Games
 Stuxnet
 Flame
 Duqu
 Stars virus
Alleged operations and malware by Iran
 Foreign interference in the 2020 United States elections
 Mahdi
 Shamoon
 Operation Ababil
 Operation Newscaster
 Operation Cleaver
 Yemen Cyber Army
 Syrian Electronic Army

References

External links 
 Iranians Charged with Hacking IS Financial sector (FBI)

Cyberwarfare in Iran